Elizabeth Pope may refer to:

 Elizabeth Younge (died 1797), later Pope, English actress
 Elizabeth Marie Pope (1917–1992), American author and educator